The men's welterweight event was part of the boxing programme at the 1988 Summer Olympics. The weight class allowed boxers of up to 67 kilograms to compete. The competition was held from 20 September to 1 October 1988. 44 boxers from 44 nations competed. Robert Wangila won the gold medal.

Medalists

Results
The following boxers took part in the event:

First round
 Alexander Künzler (FRG) def. Kasmiro Omona (UGA), 5:0
 Song Kyung-Sup (KOR) def. William Walsh (IRL), RSC-2
 Abdellah Taouane (MAR) def. Đỗ Tiến Tuấn (VIE), 5:0
 Siegfried Mehnert (GDR) def. José Ortiz (PUR), 5:0
 Fidele Mohinga (RCA) def. Adão Nzuzi (ANG), 5:0
 Maselino Masoe (ASA) def. Pedro Fria (DOM), RSC-1
 Alfred Addo Ankamah (GHA) def. Boston Simbeye (MLW), KO-1
 Kenneth Gould (USA) def. Joseph Marwa (TNZ), 4:1
 Søren Antman (SWE) def. Isimeli Lesivakarua (FIJ), RSC-2
 Joni Nyman (FIN) def. Manuel Sobral (CAN), 4:1
 Vladimir Ereshchenko (URS) def. Yoshiaki Takahashi (JPN), 5:0
 Dimus Chisala (ZAM) def. Wanderley Oliveira (BRA), RSC-2

Second round
 Adewale Adgebusi (NGA) def. Joseph Dary (ANT), KO-1
 Javier Martínez (ESP) def. Lucas Januario (MOZ), 5:0
 Jan Dydak (POL) def. José García (VEN), 4:1
 Humberto Aranda (COS) def. Asomua Naea (SAM), RSC-2
 Abdoukerim Hamidou (TOG) def. Francisc Vaştag (ROU), DSQ-3
 Khristo Furnigov (BUL) def. Gregory Griffiths (BRB), KO-1
 Robert Wangila (KEN) def. Đorđe Petronijević (YUG), RSC-2
 Khaidavyn Gantulga (MGL) def. Richard Hamilton (JAM), RSC-2
 Laurent Boudouani (FRA) def. Imre Bacskai (HUN), 4:1
 Darren Obah (AUS) def. Abdullah al-Barwani (OMA), RSC-3
 Song Kyung-Sup (KOR) def. Alexander Künzler (FRG), 5:0
 Siegfried Mehnert (GDR) def. Abdellah Taouane (MAR), 5:0
 Maselino Masoe (ASA) def. Fidele Mohinga (RCA), RSC-2
 Kenneth Gould (USA) def. Alfred Addo Ankamah (GHA), 5:0
 Joni Nyman (FIN) def. Søren Antman (SWE), 5:0
 Dimus Chisala (ZAM) def. Vladimir Ereshchenko (URS), RSC-1

Third round
 Adewale Adgebusi (NGA) def. Javier Martínez (ESP), 5:0
 Jan Dydak (POL) def. Humberto Aranda (COS), 4:1
 Khristo Furnigov (BUL) def. Abdoukerim Hamidou (TOG), 5:0
 Robert Wangila (KEN) def. Khaidavyn Gantulga (MGL), AB-2
 Laurent Boudouani (FRA) def. Darren Obah (AUS), 5:0
 Song Kyung-Sup (KOR) def. Siegfried Mehnert (GDR), 3:2
 Kenneth Gould (USA) def. Maselino Masoe (ASA), 5:0
 Joni Nyman (FIN) def. Dimus Chisala (ZAM), 5:0

Quarterfinals
 Jan Dydak (POL) def. Adewale Adgebusi (NGA), 4:1
 Robert Wangila (KEN) def. Khristo Furnigov (BUL), 5:0
 Laurent Boudouani (FRA) def. Song Kyung-Sup (KOR), 3:2
 Kenneth Gould (USA) def. Joni Nyman (FIN), 5:0

Semifinals
 Robert Wangila (KEN) def. Jan Dydak (POL), walk-over
 Laurent Boudouani (FRA) def. Kenneth Gould (USA), 4:1

Final
 Robert Wangila (KEN) def. Laurent Boudouani (FRA), KO-2

References

Welterweight